Nachhiring is a Kirati language spoken mostly in the eastern hills of Nepal. It not merges into Kulung in the north and Sampang in the south. A follower of the Nachiring sub-caste

Dapsnu (Samei) of Kirat Nachiring sub-caste (Pacha) Kirat Nachiring sub-caste has 110 (Samei) as found through research so far. We have 110 sub-caste of the Nachiring community. E.g. Hamele, Sibirikhu, Kubiti, Temsu others.

Names
The name can also be spelled Nachering, Nachhereng, Nacchhering, Nasring "Bangdel". "Bangdale" is a tribal name. Ethnologue lists the alternate names Bangdale, Bangdel Tûm, Bangdile, Mathsereng, Nacchhering, Nacering Ra, Nachering Tûm, Nachiring, Nasring, Nasru Bhra.

Geographical distribution
Nachering is spoken in the following locations of Nepal (Ethnologue).

Upper northeastern Khotang District, Koshi Province (in the Lidim Khola river slopes area near Rawakhola valley, headwaters and tributaries to southern Aiselukharke): Rakha, Bangdel, Dipsun, Para, Badel, Patel, Bakachol, and Aiselukharka VDC's
Solukhumbu District: Waddu and Sotang VDC's

Grollmann (2018:2) reports that Nachiring is spoken in the villages of Aiselukharka, Hume, Para, Bakachol, Badel, Bangdel, Rakha, and Sumtel. It is not spoken anymore by ethnic Nachiring people living in Dharapani, Dipsun, and Dimma villages.

References

Grollmann, Selin. 2018. A first field report on Nachiring (Kiranti). Himalayan Linguistics, Vol. 17(1): 1–18.

Kiranti languages
Languages of Nepal
Languages of Koshi Province